Maddie Rooney may refer to:

Maddie Rooney (Liv and Maddie), fictional character in the American television series Liv and Maddie
Maddie Rooney (ice hockey) (born 1997), American ice hockey player